Pultenaea fragrans is a species of flowering plant in the family Fabaceae and is endemic to a small area of New South Wales. It is an erect shrub with flattened cladodes, small, scale-like leaves, and pea-like, yellow and red flowers.

Description
There are also bracteoles but that fall off before the flower opens.

Taxonomy and naming
Bossiaea fragrans was first formally described in 2009 by Keith Leonard McDougall in the journal Telopea from specimens he collected in the Abercrombie Karst Conservation Area.

Distribution and habitat
This bossiaea is only known from two populations near Abercrombie Caves on the southern tablelands of New South Wales where it grows in woodland.

Conservation status
Bossiaea fragrans is listed as "critically endangered" under the Australian Government Environment Protection and Biodiversity Conservation Act 1999 and the New South Wales Government Biodiversity Conservation Act 2016.

References

fragrans
Flora of New South Wales
Plants described in 2009